Bernard Wilkinson (né Pickles; 12 March 1878 – 28 May 1949) was a professional footballer who won the 1902 FA Cup final with Sheffield United.

Honours
Sheffield United
 FA Cup winner: 1902

References

External links

1878 births
1949 deaths
English footballers
England international footballers
Sheffield United F.C. players
Rotherham Town F.C. (1899) players
Association football midfielders
Thorpe Hesley F.C. players
FA Cup Final players